Esprit de corps is a French phrase meaning the morale of a group. 

Esprit de Corps may also refer to:

 Esprit de Corps (magazine), a Canadian military magazine
 Esprit de Corps (EP), a 2005 EP by Wild Beasts
 "Esprit de Corps" (The Avengers), an episode of the British spy-fi television series The Avengers
 Esprit de Corps (film), 2014 Philippines film by Kanakan Balintagos about the military

See also
 Esprit (disambiguation)